Thomas Garrett Cavanagh (March 24, 1982 – January 6, 2011) was an American professional ice hockey center who last played with the Springfield Falcons of the American Hockey League. He was drafted by the San Jose Sharks in the sixth round, 182nd overall, of the 2001 NHL Entry Draft. After playing four seasons at Harvard University, he was signed to a professional contract by the Sharks organization.

Cavanagh made his National Hockey League debut with San Jose near the end of the 2007–08 season and recorded an assist on his first shift. The following season, he scored his lone NHL goal March 28, 2009, a backhand shot past Phoenix Coyotes goaltender Ilya Bryzgalov.

Playing career
Cavanagh attended Phillips Exeter Academy.

Cavanagh was the first player to play every single one of the Harvard's games during his collegiate career. Cavanagh made his 138th consecutive appearance in a Crimson jersey in Harvard's final game of the 2005 NCAA Tournament.

Cavanagh is the Worcester Sharks' all-time scoring leader with 138 points in 202 games.
Cavanagh holds the San Jose Sharks franchise record for quickest point by a rookie for an assist on a goal by Joe Thornton that came 36 seconds into Cavanagh's first game in the NHL.

Death
Cavanagh was found dead in the Providence Place Mall parking garage on January 6, 2011. The cause of death was identified as multiple traumatic injuries due to blunt force impact. Police have stated that they believe the death to be a suicide. Cavanagh had been diagnosed with schizophrenia, and was institutionalized several times in the last months of his life. Cavanagh had been released from his contract with the Falcons on November 9, 2010.

Career statistics

Awards and honors

References

External links

Thomas G. Cavanagh Memorial Fund, a fund dedicated to raising awareness about mental illness.

1982 births
2011 suicides
American men's ice hockey centers
Cleveland Barons (2001–2006) players
Harvard Crimson men's ice hockey players
Ice hockey players from Rhode Island
Sportspeople from Warwick, Rhode Island
People with schizophrenia
Phillips Exeter Academy alumni
San Jose Sharks draft picks
San Jose Sharks players
Springfield Falcons players
Worcester Sharks players